The Ilergetes were an ancient Iberian (Pre-Roman) people of the Iberian peninsula (the Roman Hispania) who dwelt in the plains area of the rivers Segre and Cinca towards Iberus (Ebro) river, and in and around Ilerda/Iltrida, present-day Lleida/Lérida. They are believed to have spoken the Iberian language.

Indibilis
Indibilis, king or chief of the Ilergetes, resisted against the Carthaginian and Roman invasions.

See also
Iberians
Pre-Roman peoples of the Iberian Peninsula

External links
Detailed map of the Pre-Roman Peoples of Iberia (around 200 BC)

Pre-Roman peoples of the Iberian Peninsula
History of Catalonia
Ancient peoples of Spain